Greenwoodochromis christyi is a species of fish in the family Cichlidae. It is endemic to the deeper water of southern Lake Tanganyika. The specific name of this fish honours the explorer and naturalist Cuthbert Christy (1863-1932).

References

christyi
Cichlid fish of Africa
Fish of Lake Tanganyika
Fish of Zambia
Endemic fauna of Zambia
Fish described in 1953
Taxa named by Ethelwynn Trewavas
Taxonomy articles created by Polbot